José Ramón Martel López (born 10 January 1955) is a Mexican politician from the Institutional Revolutionary Party. He has  served as Deputy of the LI and LXI Legislatures of the Mexican Congress representing the State of Mexico.

References

1955 births
Living people
People from San Luis Potosí City
Institutional Revolutionary Party politicians
21st-century Mexican politicians
Deputies of the LXI Legislature of Mexico
Members of the Chamber of Deputies (Mexico) for the State of Mexico